Semele (minor planet designation: 86 Semele) is a large and very dark main-belt asteroid with an orbital period of 5.5 years. It is rotating with a period of 16.6 hours, and varies in magnitude by 0.13 during each cycle. This object is classified as a C-type asteroid and is probably composed of carbonates.

Semele was discovered by German astronomer Friedrich Tietjen on January 4, 1866. It was his first and only asteroid discovery. It is named after Semele, the mother of Dionysus in Greek mythology.

The orbit of 86 Semele places it in a 13:6 mean motion resonance with the planet Jupiter. The computed Lyapunov time for this asteroid is only 6,000 years, indicating that it occupies a chaotic orbit that will change randomly over time because of gravitational perturbations of the planets. This Lyapunov time is the second lowest among the first 100 named minor planets.

References

External links
 
 

C-type asteroids (Tholen)
Background asteroids
Semele
Semele
18660104